Ann "Athena" Osman (born 19 June 1986) is a Malaysian mixed martial artist who became the country's first female mixed martial artist.

Born in Kota Kinabalu, Sabah dan grew up in the United States, Osman is the Malaysia's first-ever woman to compete professionally in ONE Fighting Championship (ONE FC). She has trained for two years in MMA and has a strong background in Muay Thai where she was trained by her coach AJ "Pyro" Lias Mansor. 

In November 2017, she announced her retirement from her MMA career with a professional record of 5–4, wanting to focus on her new careers.

She has been married and has a one child.

Mixed martial arts record

|-
|Loss 
|align=center|5–4 
|May Ooi 
|Submission (rear-naked choke) 
|ONE: Quest for Greatness
|
|align=center|1
|align=center|3:27
|Kuala Lumpur, Malaysia 
|
|-
|Win 
|align=center|5–3 
|Vy Srey Khouch
|TKO (punches) 
|ONE: Throne of Tigers
|
|align=center|1
|align=center|4:58 
|Kuala Lumpur, Malaysia 
|
|-
|Loss 
|align=center|4–3
|April Osenio
|Submission (guillotine choke) 
|ONE: Unbreakable Warriors
|
|align=center|1
|align=center|4:09 
|Kuala Lumpur, Malaysia 
|
|-
|Win 
|align=center|4–2 
|Haiat Farag Youssef 
|Submission (armbar) 
|ONE: Dynasty of Champions (Anhui)
|
|align=center|1
|align=center|3:59
|Anhui, China 
|
|-
|Loss
|align=center|3–2 
|Irina Mazepa
|TKO (punches)
|ONE: Tigers of Asia 
|
|align=center|1
|align=center|3:05
|Kuala Lumpur, Malaysia 
|
|-
|Win
|align=center|3–1 
|Walaa Abas
|Submission (rear-naked choke) 
|ONE: Age of Champions
|
|align=center|1
|align=center|2:23
|Kuala Lumpur, Malaysia 
|
|-
|Win
|align=center|2–1
|Aya Saied Saber
|TKO (punches) 
|ONE FC: Roar of Tigers
|
|align=center|1
|align=center|3:15
|Kuala Lumpur, Malaysia 
|
|-
|Win
|align=center|1–1
|Ana Julaton
|Decision (split)
|ONE FC: Reign of Champions
|
|align=center|3
|align=center|5:00
|  Dubai, UAE
|
|-
|Loss
|align=center| 0–1
|Sherilyn Lim
|Decision (split) 
|ONE FC: Total Domination
|
|align=center|3
|align=center|5:00
|Kallang, Singapore 
|
|-
|}

References

External links

 

1986 births
Living people
Malaysian people of Malay descent
Malaysian Muslims
People from Sabah
Malaysian female mixed martial artists
Mixed martial artists utilizing Muay Thai
Malaysian Muay Thai practitioners
Female Muay Thai practitioners